The Longshou II Dam, also referred to as Longshou No. 2, is a concrete-face rock-fill dam on the Heihe River, located  southwest of Zhangye in Gansu Province, China. It is part of the Gansu Heihe Rural Hydropower Development and supports a 157 MW power station. The dam's first feasibility study was carried out in 2000 and river diversion construction began in December 2001. In June 2002, the river was diverted and in September that year, filling of the dam's body began. On 17 August 2004, the first generator was operational with the rest by the end of the year.
Upstream is the Xiaogushan Dam, a gravity dam which diverts water to a 102 MW power station.

See also

List of dams and reservoirs in China
List of major power stations in Gansu

References

Dams in China
Hydroelectric power stations in Gansu
Concrete-face rock-fill dams
Dams completed in 2004